Kemp-Frieden House is a historic inn and tavern building located at Maxatawny Township, Berks County, Pennsylvania. It was built about 1740, and is a 2 1/2-story, rectangular limestone building.  A two-story, four bay, western addition and one-story rear wing was built in 1852.  The building has a slate covered gable roof.

Kemp-Frieden House was originally built around 1740 by Daniel Levan, a Huguenot immigrant from Germany. The home was built along a highway that connected the Pennsylvania cities of Reading and Easton. As traffic grew, so too did the size of his home until finally, in 1765, it opened as the Levan Tavern: the first tavern in Berks County. As the years when by, its most famous patrons would be John Adams and George Washington, the former writing about stopping at the tavern in his diary. When Daniel died in 1777, he left the tavern to his son, Daniel Jr., who eventually sold the tavern to his sister Susanna and brother-in-law, George Kemp, who renamed the tavern to the Kemp's Hotel. There are two special stones on the front face of the building bearing their names. One says the name of George Kemp, and the other, Susana Kemp, both have the date of 1795. The hotel remained opened until 1852, but stayed in the Kemp family for around 200 years, when it was sold again, and became the Season's Grille. The restaurant closed in the early 2000's due to the fluctuating economy. The second floor of the building is believed to be haunted by the spirit of Susanna Kemp. After sitting abandoned for many years, in January 2013, Brandi Woodard bought the building and renovated it, restoring it to modern standards while also retaining aspects of its colonial architecture. It reopened in May 2013 as The Yoga House and Nectar’s Cafe & Juice Bar. On December 17, 2014, Brandi Woodard announced that she is putting the building up for sale. 

The property stood vacant until June, 2022, when it was purchased by Habitats for Hope as a premier comprehensive residential aftercare facility for men seeking a solid foundation for their recovery journey. It was therefore renamed "Kemp-Frieden House".

It was added to the National Register of Historic Places in 1978.

References

External links
Habitats of Hope/Kemp-Frieden House
Tree Rings: The Levan Tavern / Kemp’s Hotel
"Moratorium on demolitions in Maxatawny Township a possibility: Officials could develop plan to protect historic properties, expert says," Reading Eagle, Ron Devlin, September 15, 2012
Save the Kemp Hotel (Levan House), facebook.com

Hotel buildings on the National Register of Historic Places in Pennsylvania
Commercial buildings completed in 1852
Buildings and structures in Berks County, Pennsylvania
1852 establishments in Pennsylvania
National Register of Historic Places in Berks County, Pennsylvania